Charles E. Noble (July 24, 1931 – March 7, 2011) was an American professional basketball player.

A 6'4" shooting guard from the University of Louisville, Noble played seven seasons (1955–1962) in the National Basketball Association (NBA) as a member of the Detroit Pistons franchise.  He averaged 8.0 points per game and appeared in the 1960 NBA All-Star Game.

Noble later worked in publishing. He died in 2011.

NBA career statistics

Regular season

Playoffs

References

External links
Career statistics

1931 births
2011 deaths
American men's basketball players
Basketball players from Akron, Ohio
Detroit Pistons players
Fort Wayne Pistons players
Louisville Cardinals men's basketball players
National Basketball Association All-Stars
Philadelphia Warriors draft picks
Shooting guards